Mohamed Hamdan Dagalo (born ), generally referred to as Hemetti, Hemedti, Hemeti or Hemitte, is a Sudanese general from the Rizeigat tribe of Darfur, who was the Deputy Chairman of the Transitional Military Council (TMC) following the 2019 Sudanese coup d'état. On 21 August 2019, the TMC transferred power to the civilian–military Sovereignty Council, of which Hemetti is a member. Under Article 19 of the August 2019 Draft Constitutional Declaration, Hemetti and the other Sovereignty Council members are ineligible to run in the 2022 Sudanese general election.

Hemetti stated to African Union officials his co-responsibility in carrying out the 23 November 2004 Adwa massacre and rapes in South Darfur. Since 2013 Hemetti has commanded the Rapid Support Forces (RSF), which, according to Human Rights Watch and professor Eric Reeves, was responsible for crimes against humanity, including systematic killings of civilians and rapes, in Darfur in 2014 and 2015. The RSF was widely claimed to hold major responsibility for the 3 June 2019 Khartoum massacre while Hemetti continued to be its leader. Hemetti used the RSF to take control of gold mining operations in 2017. In 2019 he was one of the richest people in Sudan via his company al-Junaid, which had a wide array of business interests including investment, mining, transport, car rental, iron and steel. In early July 2019, Hemetti was considered to be the most powerful person in Sudan. On behalf of the Transitional Military Council, Hemetti signed a Political Agreement on 17 July 2019 and a Draft Constitutional Declaration on 4 August 2019, together with Ahmed Rabee on behalf of the Forces of Freedom and Change (FFC), as major steps in the 2019 Sudanese transition to democracy. In September 2019, Hemetti helped negotiate a peace deal between groups in armed conflict in Port Sudan.

Childhood and youth
He attended primary school up to third grade and had no other formal education. He moved to North Darfur and then settled in South Darfur in 1987. He is a member of the Awlad Mansour sub-section of the Mahariya tribe, which is part of the camel herding (Abbala) Northern Rizeigat tribal confederation. Hemetti traded camels prior to the War in Darfur.

Elite prejudice
According to Alex de Waal from Tufts University, political elites in Khartoum are prejudiced against Hemetti on the basis of his origin from Darfur and lack of formal education. De Waal stated, "The Khartoum elites are unanimous that [Hemetti] cannot be the ruler of Sudan, because as an uneducated Darfurian he is from the wrong class and the wrong place, and lacks the formal qualifications of education or staff college."

Paramilitary career and war crimes

Hemetti became a leader of the Janjaweed during the War in Darfur that started in 2003 and an "amir" in the Border Guards in the same year. He was appointed brigadier–general in the newly created Rapid Support Forces (RSF) by the 1989–2019 government of Omar al-Bashir, who, is a fugitive indicted for war crimes, crimes against humanity and genocide by the International Criminal Court (ICC). The RSF was created in 2013 under the leadership of Hemetti, out of former Janjaweed groups of fighters, several of whose leaders and supporters (Ahmed Haroun, Ali Kushayb, Abdel Rahim Mohammed Hussein, in addition to al-Bashir) have been indicted for war crimes by the ICC.

Sudanese political cartoonist Khalid Albaih claimed that the soldiers commanded by Hemetti "committed countless war crimes" during the war. A Western diplomat interviewed by The National claimed that Hemetti aims to "distance himself" from the war crimes that occurred during the war. Niemat Ahmadi, the founder of Darfur Women Action Group, stated that Hemetti became well known during the War in Darfur "because of the people he killed, the number of villages he destroyed, the many women who were raped". Sudan researcher Eric Reeves estimated that it is "likely" that Hemetti has "accumulated more Sudanese blood on his hands in conflict in Darfur and [in the conflict in] South Kordofan—as well as in Khartoum and elsewhere—than any other man in the country" and that Hemetti's management of the war was "by means of serial atrocity crimes, including genocide and crimes against humanity".

23 November 2004 Adwa massacre
Hemetti was the leader of one of the Rizeigat militias who killed 126 villagers in Adwa in South Darfur in a methodical, systematic attack starting on 23 November 2004 at 6am. The militias burned all the houses, and burned some bodies and threw others in wells to hide evidence of the massacre. The militias shot male villagers immediately, raped young girls and detained women for two days. Hemetti stated to African Union officials that the massacre had been planned in coordination with government soldiers over several months.

2014–2015 crimes against humanity in Darfur
In 2014, the RSF, led by Hemetti, carried out the "Operation Decisive Summer" in South Darfur and North Darfur from late February to early May 2014, during which they carried out "killings, mass rape and torture of civilians; the forced displacement of entire communities; the destruction of the physical infrastructure necessary for sustaining life in the harsh desert environment including wells, food stores, shelter, and farming implements." RSF members under Hemetti's command repeatedly attacked and burned 10 towns in South Darfur, mostly during the two days starting 27 February 2014. Witnesses interviewed by Human Rights Watch (HRW) reported killings of civilians and rapes by RSF personnel.

Sudan Liberation Movement/Army rebels of Minni Minawi's faction (SLA/MM) had been present in some of the towns but had left them at the time of the crimes against humanity carried out under Hemetti's command. Witnesses reported men shot in the head by the RSF after having been forced to lie on the ground, and women selected for rape in the bush. Khalil, a witness from Hiraiga, stated that he saw Hemetti enter Hiraiga with other RSF members on the day that seven women, whom Khalil named, were raped either in Hiraiga or in Afouna nearby. In the village of Um Bargarain, Hemetti's RSF separated the men from the children and assassinated the men.

In March 2014, Hemetti's RSF moved to North Darfur and continued to destroy villages in which the SLA/MM was absent and shoot and rape civilians. In "Operation Decisive Summer" phase II, the RSF, together with other government soldiers, carried out a campaign of killings of civilians and rapes in Jebel Marra and East Jebel Marra from December 2014 to May 2015.

Ibrahim, a defector from RSF interviewed by HRW, stated that Hemetti and other RSF officers gave orders to "abuse women". Ibrahim saw 11 women raped during an RSF attack on Hijer Tunyo and admitted to killing one woman whom he tried to rape.

Business interests
Hemetti used the RSF to take over gold mines and arrest rival Janjaweed leader Musa Hilal in November 2017, with the result that Hemetti became the biggest gold trader in Sudan via his company al-Junaid. This gave him considerable financial power in Sudan since gold trade constituted forty percent of Sudanese exports in 2017. Al-Junaid (or Al Gunade) is run by Hemetti's brother Abdul Rahim Hamdan Dagalo, the deputy head of the RSF, and two of Abdul Rahim's sons. Hemetti was on the Al Junaid Board of Directors in 2009. By around 2019, al-Junaid had expanded to deal in "investment, mining, transport, car rental, iron and steel". In April 2019 Hemetti was described by Alex de Waal as "one of the richest men in Sudan ... at the centre of a web of patronage, secret security deals, and political payoffs."

2019 Sudanese coup d'état
Hemetti became Deputy head of the Transitional Military Council (TMC) after using the RSF to detain former president al-Bashir during the 2019 Sudanese coup d'état.

In May 2019, Hemetti's first international trip was to Saudi Arabia to meet Mohammad bin Salman, during which he stated: "Sudan is standing with the kingdom against all threats and attacks from Iran and Houthi militias." Al Jazeera English suggested that Hemetti was seen as the real head of the Transitional Military Council rather than the official head Abdel Fattah al-Burhan. The National described Hemetti as "widely seen to be ambitious and a seasoned political player".

The 3 June 2019 Khartoum massacre in which 100 protestors were killed, hundreds wounded, and other civilians raped and homes pillaged, were carried out in large part by the RSF under Hemetti's leadership according to The Daily Beast and Sudanese political cartoonist Khalid Albaih. Albaih described Hemetti as "Sudan's version of Saudi Crown Prince Mohammed bin Salman, ..., young and power-hungry ... and just like MBS[,] ruthless."

2019 transition procedures
On behalf of the TMC, as the 2018–19 Sudanese protests continued, Hemetti signed a Political Agreement on 17 July 2019, together with Ahmed Rabee on behalf of the FFC. On 4 August 2019 Hemetti and Rabee signed, on behalf of the TMC and FFC, a Constitutional Declaration to define details of transitional arrangements absent from the Political Agreement. The transition procedures plan for a 39-month duration including a Sovereign Council of five civilians, five military officials, and a civilian leader chosen by consensus between the TMC and the FFC.

Sovereignty Council member
On 21 August 2019, Hemetti became one of the 11 members of the transitional, collective, combined military–civilian head of state, called the Sovereignty Council. Under Article 19 of the August 2019 Draft Constitutional Declaration, Hemetti, along with the other Sovereignty Council members, is forbidden from running in the 2022 Sudanese general election scheduled to end the transitional period.

In September 2019, Hemetti helped groups in Port Sudan from the Beni-Amer people and the Nuba peoples who had been in armed conflict to reach a conciliation deal. Before the signing ceremony, he had said that he would deport both tribes, if they did not reach a deal, and after the deal was signed, he apologised for his "earlier tough language".

Matters of Peace

Mohamed Hamdan Daglo has led the governmental negotiations team with the rebel movements in Juba, the capital of South Sudan. And following many rounds with the leaders of these movements, who have been rebelling against the state since 2003, in the regions of Darfur, Blue Nile, and South Kordofan, they managed to reach a peace agreement in October 2020.

References

1975 births
Living people
Members of the Sovereignty Council of Sudan
Sudanese generals